The Japanese Village and Deer Park is a defunct amusement park formerly located in Buena Park, California.

History
The park first opened in 1967 at 6122 Knott Ave. It was a Japanese-themed amusement park that featured shows and traditional Japanese buildings in an environment where deer roamed free (inspired by Nara Park). Its gate featured a torii.

Two episodes of the CBS-TV detective drama Mannix, "Overkill" (1971, Season 4 episode 24) and "Enter Tami Okada" (1974, Season 8 episode 8), filmed extensive sequences at the park. Various exhibits and animals can be seen in both. The second featured a trainer riding two dolphins in tandem.

The park closed in 1975, five years after it was sold to Great Southwest Co., a subsidiary of Six Flags. Facing mounting red ink, the owners began giving the deer lethal injections, claiming they had tuberculosis. Almost 200 were euthanized before authorities ended the practice.

List of attractions
Koi ponds
Japanese Garden
Classic Tea House
The Dove Pavilion
Dolphin feeding 
Home of the Fuji Folk
Pearl divers

Enchanted Village
After the park closed, a second amusement park, Enchanted Village, opened on the site on June 18, 1976. Animal trainer Ralph Helfer was a partner and served as chair. It was, for a time, home to Oliver the "human" chimpanzee. Prior to its closure, its signature stunt and animal show was changed to incorporate themes and story lines from the 1977 film The Island of Dr. Moreau.  Enchanted Village can be seen briefly in the 1977 film Curse of the Black Widow. The  park was South Pacific-Tiki themed, and featured trained animal shows (Helfer's influence), a traditional-styled Polynesian show, and a few ride attractions. The park closed in fall 1977.

Current use
The area has been developed into a business park; nothing remains of the ponds and locations except George Bellis Park.

References

Landmarks in California
Buildings and structures in Orange County, California
Defunct amusement parks in California
History of Orange County, California
1975 disestablishments in California
1967 establishments in California
Buena Park, California